The York Public Library is a historic building in York, Nebraska. It was built in 1901-1902 thanks to a donation from York resident Lyndia Woods. It was designed in the Romanesque Revival style by architect Morrison H. Vail. It has been listed on the National Register of Historic Places since December 4, 1990.

References

National Register of Historic Places in York County, Nebraska
Romanesque Revival architecture in Nebraska
Library buildings completed in 1901
Public libraries in Nebraska